The FIS Nordic Junior World Ski Championships 2003 took place in Sollefteå, Sweden from 4 February to 9 February 2003. It was the 26th Junior World Championships in nordic skiing.

Schedule
All times are in Central European Time (CET).

Cross-country

Nordic combined

Ski jumping

Medal summary

Junior events

Cross-country skiing

Nordic Combined

Ski jumping

Medal table

References 

2003
2003 in cross-country skiing
2003 in ski jumping
Junior World Ski Championships
2003 in youth sport
International sports competitions hosted by Sweden